Sam Coates is a British journalist. He has worked for Sky News since 2019 as their deputy political editor. Coates previously worked as a newspaper journalist for The Times from 2000 until 2019.



Early life and education

Coates studied English and Social & Political Sciences (SPS) at the University of Cambridge.

Career

The Times
Coates joined The Times in 2000 as a graduate trainee, working on the diary, foreign desk and as a general reporter. He won the Laurence Stern fellowship in 2005, and worked at The Washington Post during summer 2005. Coates joined The Times lobby team in 2005 as Chief Political Correspondent, before being promoted to Deputy Political Editor in November 2010. In 2012, Coates spent a year as banking editor of The Times.

During his time working at The Times, he contributed to the 2010 The Times Guide to the House of Commons, and his picture of the 2017 Westminster attack was used on the front cover of the newspaper. His reaction to Boris Johnson ruling himself out in the 2016 Conservative Party leadership election led to Coates featuring in the Daily Mirror and other outlets. Coates was said to be "pivotal to The Times' parliamentary coverage" in a 2019 report.

Whilst at The Times, Coates regularly presented BBC Radio 4's Week in Westminster. Coates also appeared as a paper reviewer on BBC One's The Andrew Marr Show, Politics Live, and appeared on ABC's Lateline programme in March 2012. He also appeared on ABC's Insiders programme on 2 May 2010 alongside future Sky News colleague Adam Boulton.

Sky News
In February 2019, it was announced that Coates would be joining Sky News later that year as deputy political editor, replacing Beth Rigby who was promoted to political editor. Coates obtained a leaked document regarding the impact of a no-deal Brexit which featured widely in news outlets in the UK and Ireland.

In the build-up to Britain's proposed exit from the European Union on the 31 October 2019, Coates participated in Sky News' #Brexplainer feature, and featured in Sky News' 2019 general election overnight coverage.

Selected bibliography

References 

Living people
The Times journalists
Sky News newsreaders and journalists
English television journalists
British journalists
British male journalists
21st-century British journalists
British newspaper journalists
British political journalists
Year of birth missing (living people)